Terry Felix (born 9 September 1959) is a Canadian retired soccer player who earned three caps for the national team in 1983. He played club soccer for the Vancouver Whitecaps competing in the North American Soccer League (NASL).

He was the first indigenous player to play professionally in North America, and the first to represent Canada.

Early life 
Felix was born in Matsqui, British Columbia. His father Peter was born on the Chehalis Indian Reserve in Agassiz and  his mother Dolores was born on the Katzie Indian Reserve near Vancouver; Felix himself was raised on the Sts'ailes First Nation Indian Reservation. He began playing soccer at the age of six.

Club career 
At the age of 16 Felix joined Sasquatch Inn SC.

On 10 July 1983 Felix made his professional debut for the Vancouver Whitecaps in front of 50,000 fans in a match against the New York Cosmos. In doing so he became the first indigenous soccer player to play professionally in North America. He made 8 appearances in total that season, scoring two goals and making one assist. He retired after suffering a ligament injury.

International career 
He represented Canada in Olympic Qualifiers and made five international appearances in 1983 for the national senior team, including three caps. In doing so he became the first indigenous player to represent Canada.

Later life 
Felix married and had seven children, and worked full time on the Sts'ailes First Nation reserve, whilst also working as a prison counsellor.

References

External links
 

1961 births
Living people
20th-century First Nations people
Association football forwards
Canada men's international soccer players
Canadian soccer players
Coast Salish people
First Nations sportspeople
North American Soccer League (1968–1984) players
Soccer people from British Columbia
Sportspeople from Abbotsford, British Columbia
Vancouver Whitecaps (1974–1984) players